"Building a Mystery" is a song by Canadian singer-songwriter Sarah McLachlan from her fourth studio album, Surfacing (1997). At a live performance, Sarah explains the song as being "basically about the fact that we all... have insecurities to hide, and we often do that by putting on a facade." She also goes on to say that "unfortunately, if we just be who we are, that's usually the more attractive and beautiful thing".

Released on June 9, 1997, the song was an immediate top-40 and adult contemporary hit that paved the grounds for her future songs "Sweet Surrender", "Adia", and "Angel", all from Surfacing, and it has received several awards. Commercially, "Building a Mystery" was Canada's most successful single of 1997, topping the country's official chart for eight weeks, and peaked at number 13 in the United States. "Building a Mystery" won the Grammy Award for Best Female Pop Vocal Performance at the 40th Grammy Awards.

Censorship
The album version of "Building a Mystery," and the live albums Afterglow Live and Mirrorball contain the line, "A beautiful fucked up man." The radio version replaces this line with "A beautiful but strange man" or the original lyric garbled beyond recognition, and during performances on radio or television, Sarah sings the line "A beautiful messed up man."

Reception
The song won the Juno Award for Single of the Year in 1998. The track also made Sarah McLachlan the recipient of the Grammy Award for Best Female Pop Vocal Performance at the Grammy Awards of 1998, beating Mariah Carey, Shawn Colvin, Paula Cole and Jewel. It came in at number 91 on VH1's "100 Greatest Songs of the '90s".

Chart performance
"Building a Mystery" became McLachlan's biggest chart hit in Canada, spending eight weeks at number one on the RPM Top Singles chart and ranking at number one on the magazine's year-end chart for 1997. It also topped the RPM Adult Contemporary and Alternative 30 charts. In the United States, it debuted at number 18 on the Billboard Hot 100 in early September 1997 and peaked at number 13 a month later. In Australia, the song gained minor popularity, reaching number 97 in March 1998.

Music video
Directed by Matt Mahurin, the music video for the song features Moist front man David Usher. It features a man, described as McLachlan's boyfriend, taking points of light from wherever he travels and stitching some sort of garment. When McLachlan investigates in his absence, she finds that he has been assembling a skirt so decorated as to be lit with stars.

Legacy
On 23 October 2001, "Building a Mystery" became the first song ever publicly played on an Apple iPod.  Apple founder, chairman and CEO Steve Jobs selected and played a short portion of the song during the presentation in which he first introduced the iPod to the public at Apple Campus in Cupertino, California.

Track listings
US CD and cassette single
 "Building a Mystery" – 4:06
 "I Will Remember You" – 4:53

US maxi-CD single and Australian CD single
 "Building a Mystery" – 4:06
 "I Will Remember You" – 4:53
 "Possession" – 4:39
 "Angel" (soft drum mix) – 4:30

Personnel
Personnel are lifted from the Surfacing liner notes.
 Sarah McLachlan – writing, vocals, acoustic and electric guitars
 Pierre Marchand – writing, background vocals, production, recording, mixing
 Michel Pepin – additional electric guitars
 Brian Minato – bass
 Ash Sood – drums

Charts

Weekly charts

Year-end charts

Release history

See also
 List of RPM number-one singles of 1997 (Canada)
 List of RPM Rock/Alternative number-one singles (Canada)

References

1997 singles
1997 songs
Arista Records singles
Grammy Award for Best Female Pop Vocal Performance
Juno Award for Single of the Year singles
Music videos credited to Alan Smithee
Nettwerk Records singles
RPM Top Singles number-one singles
Sarah McLachlan songs
Songs written by Pierre Marchand
Songs written by Sarah McLachlan